Toby Sims (born 15 October 1997) is an English footballer who currently plays as a defender for EFL League Two club Harrogate Town.

Career

Early career
Sims played with Northern Premier League side Mickleover Sports during their 2016–2017 season.

In 2017, Sims attended Chowan University to play college soccer. From 2017 to 2021, with the 2020 season cancelled due to the COVID-19 pandemic, Sims made 64 appearances for the Hawks, scoring 16 goals and tallying 6 assists. Sims earned numerous accolades at Chowan, including being named Conference Carolinas Second Team, two-time NCCSIA All-State First Team, four-time Conference Carolinas First Team, D2CCA All-Region Second Team, D2CCA All-Region First Team, D2CCA Third Team All-American, D2CCA All-Southeast Region First Team, and three-time Conference Carolinas Defensive Player of the Year.

Whilst at college, Sims also played in the NPSL with Greenville FC during their 2018 and 2019 seasons. He also played in the USL League Two in 2021, making 15 appearances for South Carolina United on their way to the Deep South Division title, and been named 2021 League Two Defender of the Year.

Professional
On 25 February 2022, Sims signed with USL Championship club Pittsburgh Riverhounds. He made his professional debut on 12 March 2022, appearing as a 68th–minute substitute during a 3–0 win over Memphis 901.

On 5 January 2023, Sims returned to his native England when he joined League Two club Harrogate Town on a six-month contract following a successful trial period.

References

External links
Toby Sims at Chowan University
Toby Sims Pittsburgh Riverhounds Profile

1997 births
Living people
Association football defenders
English expatriate footballers
English expatriate sportspeople in the United States
English footballers
Expatriate soccer players in the United States
Mickleover Sports F.C. players
National Premier Soccer League players
Northern Premier League players
Pittsburgh Riverhounds SC players
SC United Bantams players
Harrogate Town A.F.C. players
USL Championship players
USL League Two players